Inon Eliyahu (born 1 November 1993), is an Israeli professional soccer player who plays as a right-back for Maccabi Haifa.

Career 
On 31 May 2022, he signed for Maccabi Haifa.

References

External links

1993 births
Living people
Israeli footballers
Ironi Modi'in F.C. players
Maccabi Kiryat Malakhi F.C. players
Maccabi Herzliya F.C. players
Hapoel Katamon Jerusalem F.C. players
Hapoel Acre F.C. players
Hapoel Ramat Gan F.C. players
Maccabi Petah Tikva F.C. players
Maccabi Haifa F.C. players
Israeli Premier League players
Liga Leumit players
Footballers from Jerusalem
Association football defenders
Association football midfielders